This article lists important figures and events in Malaysian public affairs during the year 1967, together with births and deaths of notable Malaysians.

Incumbent political figures

Federal level
Yang di-Pertuan Agong: Sultan Ismail Nasiruddin Shah of Terengganu
Raja Permaisuri Agong: Tengku Ampuan Intan Zaharah of Terengganu
Prime Minister: Tunku Abdul Rahman Putra Al-Haj
Deputy Prime Minister: Datuk Abdul Razak
Lord President: Syed Sheh Hassan Barakbah

State level
 Sultan of Johor: Sultan Ismail
 Sultan of Kedah: Sultan Abdul Halim Muadzam Shah (Deputy Yang di-Pertuan Agong)
 Sultan of Kelantan: Sultan Yahya Petra
 Raja of Perlis: Tuanku Syed Putra
 Sultan of Perak: Sultan Idris Shah
 Sultan of Pahang: Sultan Abu Bakar
 Sultan of Selangor: Sultan Salahuddin Abdul Aziz Shah
 Sultan of Terengganu: Tengku Mahmud (Regent)
 Yang di-Pertuan Besar of Negeri Sembilan: 
Tuanku Munawir
Tuanku Jaafar
 Yang di-Pertua Negeri (Governor) of Penang: 
 Raja Tun Uda (until May)
 Tun Syed Sheikh Barabakh (from May)
 Yang di-Pertua Negeri (Governor) of Malacca: Tun Haji Abdul Malek bin Yusuf
 Yang di-Pertua Negeri (Governor) of Sarawak: Tun Abang Haji Openg
 Yang di-Pertua Negeri (Governor) of Sabah: Tun Pengiran Ahmad Raffae

Events
8 February – Tunku Abdul Rahman celebrated his 64th birthday.
February – The Institut Teknologi MARA (ITM) was established, replacing RIDA Training Centre
March – Batu Tiga Circuit (Shah Alam), the first Malaysian race track circuit, was officially opened. 
30 March – Malaysia-Hong Kong Link of SEACOM Telephone Cable was officially opened.
2 May – US-made Sikorsky S-61 military transport helicopter renamed Nuri was used by the Royal Malaysian Air Force for the first time.
10 June – Malaysia won the third Thomas Cup.
12 June – The Malaysian ringgit (Malaysian dollar) was officially introduced, replacing the Malaya and British Borneo dollar. 
1 July – Full immigration control at Malaysia-Singapore border imposed.
8 August – Malaysia a full member at the formation of ASEAN.
31 August – The 10th anniversary of Malaysia's independence was celebrated.
1 September – Bahasa Malaysia (Malay Language) became the National Language of Malaysia. The National Language Act 1967 was gazetted.
8 September – Centenary of Sarawak Council celebrated.
2 December – Malaysian Stamp Centenary celebrated.

Births
1 March – Rosyam Nor – Malay actor
Unknown date – Sazali Abdul Samad – Malaysian bodybuilder

Deaths
14 April – Tuanku Munawir ibni Almarhum Tuanku Abdul Rahman – Yang di-Pertuan Besar of Negeri Sembilan

See also
 1967 
 1966 in Malaysia | 1968 in Malaysia
 History of Malaysia

 
Years of the 20th century in Malaysia
Malaysia
Malaysia